Une Tempête (English:"A Tempest") is a 1969 play by Aimé Césaire. It is an adaptation of Shakespeare's The Tempest from a postcolonial perspective, set on an island in the Caribbean. The play was first performed at the Festival d'Hammamet in Tunisia under the direction of Jean-Marie Serreau. It later played in Avignon and Paris. Césaire uses all of the characters from Shakespeare's version, with some additions and new renderings of the original cast.

In this version, Césaire specifies that Prospero is a white master, while Ariel is a mulatto and Caliban is a black slave. These characters are the focus of the play as Césaire emphasized issues of race, power, decolonization, and anti-imperialism.

Characters 
Prospero - the rightful duke of Milan, powerful magician, and slave master

Ariel - a "mulatto slave" and fairy

Caliban - son of Sycorax and Black slave

Miranda - Prospero's daughter

Eshu - a Yoruba god

Ferdinand - the son of Alonso and Miranda's love interest

Alonso - the King of Naples

Antonio- the Duke of Naples and Prospero's brother

Gonzalo - Alonso's counselor

Trinculo - the King of Naples' jester

Stephano - the King of Naples' butler

Sebastian - Alonso's brother

Synopsis
The action in the play closely follows that of Shakespeare's play, though Césaire emphasizes the importance of the people who inhabited the island before the arrival of Prospero and his daughter Miranda: Caliban and Ariel. Both have been enslaved by Prospero, though Caliban was the ruler of the island before Prospero's arrival.

Caliban and Ariel react differently to their situations. Caliban favors revolution over Ariel's non-violence, and rejects his name as the imposition of Prospero's colonizing language, desiring to be called X. He complains stridently about his enslavement and regrets not being powerful enough to challenge the reign of Prospero. Ariel, meanwhile, contents himself with asking Prospero to consider giving him independence.

At the end of the play, Prospero grants Ariel his freedom, but retains control of the island and of Caliban. This conclusion presents a relative contrast with Shakespeare's version, which implies that Prospero will leave the island with his daughter and the men who were shipwrecked there at the beginning of the play.

Critical Response & Analyses 
Along with much of Césaire's other work, Une Tempête is widely discussed. Some scholars, such as Ania Loomba, take issue with the idea of appropriating tales of imperialism and constructing them into anti-imperialist pieces. She comments that this style of response is potentially inhibitory to progress. Her main point is that changing the narrative not only reduces the relative legitimacy of the non-European world, but furthermore weakens the response by the sheer need to use such source material. Furthermore, she goes so far as to imply that the need to engage with the original text also implies that there is some aspect of truthfulness in that work, and almost affirms Eurocentric ideology.

Other scholars, like Russell West, approve the method of speaking directly back to the source material. West believes the play has a specific focus on assimilation and that the play grapples with the concept in a compelling way. He also sees the value in assessing the work critically, and agrees with Loomba's initial skepticism, but essentially comes to the aforementioned conclusion about assimilation.

There are nonetheless many who agree with Loomba, famously including Maryse Condé,  who even go as far as to say the creation of a movement like Négritude, which this work would fall under, legitimizes many of the problematic ideas that colonialism itself created. She laments that the need to facilitate an explicitly Black cultural movement really just affirms Western ideologies and prevents larger scale progress.

Influences
Death of a Salesman (1949) by Arthur Miller is directly referenced. The original French of Une Tempête reads, "l’orange pressée, on en rejette l’écorce," which Richard Miller translated to, "Once you've squeezed the juice from the orange, you toss the rind away!" These exclamations by Caliban to Prospero are a nod to the quote from Death of a Salesman where Willy exclaims, "You can't eat the orange and throw the peel away— a man is not a piece of fruit!"

Bibliography

References

External links

1969 plays
Martiniquais literature
Plays and musicals based on The Tempest
Postcolonial literature
Works by Aimé Césaire